Marian Leonard Tompson is one of the seven founders of La Leche League International. She was President of La Leche League for 24 years, from 1956 to 1980, and a member of the Founders Advisory Council.  Wife of the late Clement Tompson, she is the mother of seven children, a grandmother and great-grandmother.  An early advocate of home birth, four of her children, and many grandchildren and great-grandchildren were born at home.

Career 
Tompson was instrumental in developing Breastfeeding Seminars for Physicians hosted regularly by La Leche League and held annually since 1973. She has served on many boards, committees and advisory councils, including the International Advisory Council for the World Alliance for Breastfeeding Action (1996 to present).; the Advisory Board for the National Association of Post Partum Care Services (1995), the Advisory Committee for Perinatal Health, Department of Public Health for the State of Illinois (1983); and served as a consultant for the WHO/UNICEF meeting on Infant and Young Child Feeding in Geneva, Switzerland in 1980.

Tompson is an engaging speaker, often representing La Leche League at local, national and international conferences, traveling to more than 20 countries in doing so.

When questions and concerns about breastfeeding and HIV/AIDS arose in the late 1990s, Tompson began to ask questions about the available research.  This resulted in AnotherLook at Breastfeeding and HIV/AIDS, a nonprofit organization founded in 2001 dedicated to gathering information, raising critical questions, and stimulating research about breastfeeding in the context of HIV/AIDS. She is president and CEO.

Mrs. Tompson was named a Living Treasure by Mothering (magazine) in March 1998.

In 2010 Marian Tompson was asked by Dr. Thomas W. Hale of Hale Publishing to write her memoir, with the assistance of Melissa Clark Vickers.  Passionate Journey, My Unexpected Life was published in June 2011.

Interviews

In the September/October 1982 issue of Mother Earth News, Mrs. Tompson was extensively interviewed about La Leche League and the benefits of homebirth. Included are photos of the homebirth of one of her grandchildren, Austin Scott Davies.
THE PLOWBOY INTERVIEW by Pat Stone

In March, 2007, Mrs. Tompson was interviewed by the Medill School of Journalism at Northwestern University.  “I had wanted to breastfeed my babies. Yet with my first three babies, and I had three different doctors, I was never able to breastfeed past six months,” Tompson said."

In an interview on December 27, 2007, by the Pioneer Press for the Wilmette Life she explained how she was elected the first president of La Leche League: "They made me the president because it was my idea," Tompson said. "I was very shy and retiring."

She also described her first medication free birth at a local hospital:

"I was the only one in the hospital they had seen who had a natural birth," Tompson said. When Tompson gave birth to her third child, a group of 17 hospital employees—externs, interns, even the receptionist—came to watch. "They circled my delivery table," Tompson said. "After it was over, one of the residents walked up to my doctor and said, 'Doctor, how did you do it?'"

Publications

  "Passionate Journey, My Unexpected Life", Marian Leonard Tompson with Melissa Clark Vickers, Hale Publishing L.P.,  2011,
 The Womanly Art of Breastfeeding, La Leche League International, Co-author, 1st-6th Editions, 1958, 1963, 1981, 1987, 1991
 "The convenience of breast feeding" American Journal of Clinical Nutrition, Vol. 24, Issue 8, 991–992, August 1, 1971 Article

References

 Time Friday, Jul. 19, 1968
 WABA INTERNATIONAL ADVISORY COUNCIL (IAC) 2006
 Is Breast Still Best? Mothering Magazine
 Mothering Magazine March 1998
New York Times, Live Remembered 2008 Edwina Froehlich

External links
 La Leche League International
 Another Look
 Mothering Magazine
 World Alliance for Breastfeeding Action
 Marian Tompson at Hale Publishing

Breastfeeding activists
American health activists
HIV/AIDS researchers
Year of birth missing (living people)
Living people